The 2013–14 Boston University Terriers men's basketball team represented Boston University during the 2013–14 NCAA Division I men's basketball season. The Terriers, led by third year head coach Joe Jones, played their home games at Agganis Arena, with early season games at Case Gym, and were first year members of the Patriot League. They finished the season 24–11, 15–3 in Patriot League play to win the Patriot League regular season championship. They advanced to the championship game of the Patriot League tournament where they lost to American. As a regular season league champion who failed to win their league tournament, they received an automatic bid to the National Invitation Tournament where they lost in the first round to Illinois.

Roster

Schedule

|-
!colspan=9 style="background:#CC0000; color:#FFFFFF;"| Regular season

|-
!colspan=9 style="background:#CC0000; color:#FFFFFF;"| Patriot League tournament

|-
!colspan=9 style="background:#CC0000; color:#FFFFFF;"| NIT

References

Boston University Terriers men's basketball seasons
Boston University
Boston University
 Boston University Terriers men's basketball team
 Boston University Terriers men's basketball team